James Curnow (born  17 April 1943) is a composer of music for concert bands, brass bands, vocal and instrumental solos and ensembles. Curnow has also written arrangements of music pieces such as Trumpet Voluntary. He has taught at both public schools and on college and university levels.

Early life and career
James Curnow was born in Port Huron, Michigan and raised in Royal Oak, Michigan, where he received his initial musical training in the public schools and The Salvation Army Instrumental Programs in these cities. He currently lives in Nicholasville, Kentucky where he is president, composer, and educational consultant for Curnow Music Press, Inc. He also serves as Composer-in-residence (emeritus) on the faculty of Asbury University in Wilmore, Kentucky.

Selected compositions

1977, Symphonic Triptych
1979, Collage for Band
1980, Mutanza
1983, American Triptych
1984, Symphonic Variants for Euphonium and Symphonic Band
1985, Australian Variants Suite
1986, Legend and Sundance
1986, Appalachian Mountain Folk Song Suite
1987, Rejouissance Fantasia on Eine feste Burg ist unser Gott av Martin Luther
1988, Welsh Variants
1992, Silver Celebration
1994, Lochinvar
The Mortal World
The Undersea World
Fanfare and Flourishes
Fanfare and Jubiloso
Fanfare for Spartacus
Fanfare Prelude "O God, Our Help in Ages Past"
Four Colonial Country Dances
Introduction and the Humor of Boston
Lord Mayor's Delight
Colonial Jig
Devil's Dream
Freedom Road
Infinity
Introduction and Capriccio (for Clarinet and Band)
Ode and Epinicion
Odyssey
Of Courage and Patriotism
Olympic Fanfare and Theme
Pershing's Own
"Prelude on a Hymn of Praise"
"Rhapsody for Euphonium and Band"
Symphonic Poem for Winds and Percussion
The Eagle's Flight
The Music - Makers
The Old Man of the Mountain
The Shepherd's Farewell
The Sky World
Canterbury Tales 
The Spirit Soars
To Bind the Nations Wounds
Where Never Lark or Eagle Flew
Nathan Hale Trilogy

References

External links
Curnow Music Press Presents James Curnow

1943 births
Living people
American male composers
21st-century American composers
People from Royal Oak, Michigan
Asbury University faculty
21st-century American male musicians